Bungay is a town in Suffolk, East Anglia, England.

Bungay may also refer to:

People called Bungay 
 Frank Bungay (born 1905), former professional footballer
 Mike Bungay (1934-1993), New Zealand lawyer
 Stephen Bungay (born 1954), British management consultant, military historian and author
 Thomas Bungay, a 13th-century Franciscan friar and scholar in England

Places and things called Bungay
 Bungay railway station in Norfolk, England 
 Bungay Castle in Suffolk, England 
 RAF Bungay in Suffolk, England 
 Bungay Windmill in Suffolk, England 
 Bungay language, an Algonquian language in Canada
 Bungay River in Massachusetts, USA
 Tono-Bungay a novel by H G Wells